Luis Javier Vazquez (born April 27, 1976) is a retired Cuban-American mixed martial artist. A professional from 1998 until 2011, he competed for the UFC, WEC, Shooto, ShoXC, EliteXC, and King of the Cage. He is the former King of the Cage Lightweight Champion.

Early life
Born in Santiago, Cuba, on April 27, 1976, Javier Vazquez came to the United States at the age of four. He grew up in El Monte, California, and started wrestling as a sophomore at Arroyo High School at the age of 15. In 1994, he placed 3rd at the CIF wrestling tournament and continued his stellar high school career by placing 4th in the Southern Section Masters tournament. He was just one match away from placing in the high school state wrestling championships, ending up in the top 12 in the state at 130 lbs. He was voted team captain in both his junior and senior years.

Vazquez continued his wrestling career at Mt. San Antonio College where he again proved himself to be one of "the best of the best" by finishing 7th in the state and being voted team captain for his leadership on and off the mat.

In 1997, Vazquez started learning jiu-jitsu with the renowned Carlson Gracie Team. He competed in every jiu-jitsu and submission tournament he could and eventually found himself participating in mixed martial arts (MMA). His first no-holds-barred matches were at Neutral Grounds 5 in 1998. Several more fights in smaller venues followed, and he then took time off from fighting to train and compete in jiu-jitsu. After only five years of training, he earned his black belt from the Carlson Gracie Team. In 2005, Vazquez won the North American trials for the ADCC Submission Wrestling World Championship, but dropped out before competition due to a groin injury.

MMA career

Early career
In December 2009, Vazquez was named the "most inspirational performance of the decade" in MMA by Sports Illustrated magazine for his fight against Alberto Crane where he fought three rounds with a torn ACL. He went on to fight for Elite XC and was able to break free from his contract before the company folded. He signed to fight against LC Davis at Affliction: Trilogy, but the event folded 10 days before the fight was supposed to take place.

World Extreme Cagefighting
Vazquez then signed with WEC and made his promotional debut against Davis at WEC 42, In a major upset, Vazquez lost a controversial split decision to Davis. Vazquez rebounded quickly as he replaced an injured Mark Hominick against Deividas Taurosevicius at WEC 43 but lost another split decision.

Vazquez faced and defeated former UFC Lightweight Champion and former WEC featherweight title challenger Jens Pulver via armbar on March 6, 2010, at WEC 47. He defeated decorated grappler Mackens Semerzier via second round submission on August 18, 2010, at WEC 50. Vazquez was defeated by Chad Mendes via unanimous decision on November 11, 2010, at WEC 52.

Ultimate Fighting Championship
In October 2010, WEC merged with the Ultimate Fighting Championship (UFC). As part of the merger, all WEC fighters were transferred to the UFC. Vazquez defeated The Ultimate Fighter 2 winner and former lightweight title contender Joe Stevenson via unanimous decision on June 26, 2011, at UFC on Versus 4.

On January 13, 2013, Vazquez announced on Sherdog Radio Network's Rewind show that he has officially retired from MMA competition.

Personal life
In 2005, Vazquez married Rose Gracie, the daughter of Rorion Gracie and granddaughter of Hélio Gracie. They had two children together. In 2017, they subsequently filed for divorce. Vazquez was concurrently diagnosed with stage 3 colon cancer. After undergoing Gerson therapy and defeating cancer, Vazquez opened Javier Vazquez Jiu-Jitsu Academy in Rancho Cucamonga, California. He has recently taken up cycling.

Instructor lineage
Mitsuyo "Count Koma" Maeda → Carlos Gracie Sr. → Carlson Gracie Sr. → Rodrigo Medeiros  → Javier Vazquez

Championships and accomplishments
King of the Cage
KOTC Lightweight Championship (One time)

Mixed martial arts record

|-
| Win
| align=center| 16–5
| Joe Stevenson
| Decision (unanimous)
| UFC Live: Kongo vs. Barry
| 
| align=center| 3
| align=center| 5:00
| Pittsburgh, Pennsylvania, United States
| 
|-
| Loss
| align=center| 15–5
| Chad Mendes
| Decision (unanimous)
| WEC 52
| 
| align=center| 3
| align=center| 5:00
| Las Vegas, Nevada, United States
| 
|-
| Win
| align=center| 15–4
| Mackens Semerzier
| Submission (rear-naked choke)
| WEC 50
| 
| align=center| 2
| align=center| 1:35
| Las Vegas, Nevada, United States
| 
|-
| Win
| align=center| 14–4
| Jens Pulver
| Submission (armbar)
| WEC 47
| 
| align=center| 1
| align=center| 3:41
| Columbus, Ohio, United States
| 
|-
| Loss
| align=center| 13–4
| Deividas Taurosevicius
| Decision (split)
| WEC 43
| 
| align=center| 3
| align=center| 5:00
| San Antonio, Texas, United States
| 
|-
| Loss
| align=center| 13–3
| LC Davis
| Decision (split)
| WEC 42
| 
| align=center| 3
| align=center| 5:00
| Las Vegas, Nevada, United States
| 
|-
| Win
| align=center| 13–2
| Mark Kergosien
| Submission (guillotine choke)
| Ultimate Chaos
| 
| align=center| 1
| align=center| 0:59
| Biloxi, Mississippi, United States
| 
|-
| Win
| align=center| 12–2
| JC Pennington
| Submission (rear-naked choke)
| ShoXC: Elite Challenger Series
| 
| align=center| 1
| align=center| 1:15
| Santa Ynez, California, United States
| 
|-
| Win
| align=center| 11–2
| Adriano Pereira
| Decision (split)
| EliteXC: Destiny
| 
| align=center| 3
| align=center| 5:00
| Southaven, Mississippi, United States
| 
|-
| Win
| align=center| 10–2
| Rob Emerson
| Decision (split)
| Shooto: Warrior Spirit:Evolution
| 
| align=center| 3
| align=center| 5:00
| Las Vegas, Nevada, United States
| 
|-
| Loss
| align=center| 9–2
| Alberto Crane
| Decision (split)
| KOTC 21: Invasion
| 
| align=center| 3
| align=center| 5:00
| Albuquerque, New Mexico, United States
| 
|-
| Win
| align=center| 9–1
| David Gardner
| Submission (kneebar)
| KOTC 16: Double Cross
| 
| align=center| 1
| align=center| 4:31
| San Jacinto, California, United States
| 
|-
| Win
| align=center| 8–1
| Rumina Sato
| Decision (unanimous)
| Shooto: Treasure Hunt 7
| 
| align=center| 3
| align=center| 5:00
| Osaka, Japan
| 
|-
| Win
| align=center| 7–1
| Sean Wilmot
| Submission (armbar)
| KOTC 13: Revolution
| 
| align=center| 1
| align=center| 1:57
| Reno, Nevada, United States
| 
|-
| Win
| align=center| 6–1
| Philip Perez
| Submission (triangle choke)
| KOTC 10: Critical Mass
| 
| align=center| 2
| align=center| 3:58
| San Jacinto, California, United States
| 
|-
| Win
| align=center| 5–1
| Farrell Frisby
| Submission (heel hook)
| KOTC 9: Showtime
| 
| align=center| 1
| align=center| 0:48
| San Jacinto, California, United States
| 
|-
| Win
| align=center| 4–1
| Antonio Emae
| Submission (injury)
| KOTC 3: Knockout Nightmare
| 
| align=center| 1
| align=center| 1:42
| San Jacinto, California, United States
| 
|-
| Win
| align=center| 3–1
| Louie Cercedez
| Submission (armbar)
| Empire 1 Official
| 
| align=center| 1
| align=center| N/A
| Corona, California, United States
| 
|-
| Loss
| align=center| 2–1
| Victor Hunsaker
| Decision (split)
| rowspan=3|Neutral Grounds 5
| rowspan=3|
| align=center| 1
| align=center| 11:00
| rowspan=3|United States
| 
|-
| Win
| align=center| 2–0
| Kim Kellenberger
| Decision (unanimous)
| align=center| 1
| align=center| 11:00
| 
|-
| Win
| align=center| 1–0
| Sean Kim
| Submission (armbar)
| align=center| 1
| align=center| 1:37
|

References

External links 
Official Site
Official UFC Profile

Living people
1977 births
American male mixed martial artists
American mixed martial artists of Cuban descent
Cuban male mixed martial artists
Mixed martial artists from California
Featherweight mixed martial artists
Mixed martial artists utilizing collegiate wrestling
Mixed martial artists utilizing Brazilian jiu-jitsu
American male sport wrestlers
Cuban male sport wrestlers
Amateur wrestlers
American practitioners of Brazilian jiu-jitsu
Cuban practitioners of Brazilian jiu-jitsu
People awarded a black belt in Brazilian jiu-jitsu
Cuban emigrants to the United States
People from El Monte, California
People from Pomona, California
Ultimate Fighting Championship male fighters